Elizabeth Bobo (born December 21, 1943) is an American politician from Maryland and a member of the Democratic Party. She served as Howard County Executive and in the Maryland House of Delegates. Bobo was the first and only female Howard County Executive, serving from 1986 to 1990.

Early life and law career
Bobo was born in Baltimore on December 21, 1943. She graduated from Seton High School in Baltimore before earning a Bachelor of Arts degree in literature from the University of Maryland University College and a Juris Doctor degree from the University of Maryland School of Law. Bobo was admitted to the Maryland Bar in 1992 and practiced as an attorney before her election to the House of Delegates.

Political career
Bobo served one term as Howard County Executive from 1986 to 1990. She was Howard County's first and only female executive. In 1987, Bobo partnered with developer Kingdon Gould III to form a business outreach program. Charles I. Ecker defeated Bobo's bid for reelection as county executive in 1990. In 1993, Bobo married former planning board member and councilperson Lloyd G. Knowles.

In 1994, Bobo was elected to the Maryland House of Delegates. She served four terms there, representing District 12B in Howard County.

As a member of the House of Delegates, Bobo voted in favor of increasing the sales tax whilst simultaneously reducing income tax rates for some income brackets in the Tax Reform Act of 2007 (HB2). She voted in favor of in-state tuition for illegal immigrants in 2007 (HB6). She served on the Environmental Matters Committee, and was noted for distinguishing herself as an advocate for protection of the natural environment.

During the 2008 Democratic presidential primaries, Bobo supported the candidacy of Barack Obama. She served as one of the state's ten electors pledged to Obama in the general election, and cast her vote for him along with the other nine on December 15.

In 2012, Bobo announced her decision not to seek reelection in 2014.

References
 

Democratic Party members of the Maryland House of Delegates
1943 births
Living people
University of Maryland, Baltimore alumni
Women state legislators in Maryland
University of Maryland Global Campus alumni
People from Columbia, Maryland
2008 United States presidential electors
21st-century American politicians
21st-century American women politicians
Howard County Executives
Seton Keough High School alumni